Richard Nathaniel Hackett (December 4, 1866 – November 22, 1923) was a United States representative in Congress from North Carolina from 1907 through 1909.

Born in Wilkesboro, Wilkes County, North Carolina on December 4, 1866, Hackett graduated from the University of North Carolina at Chapel Hill and became a lawyer.

Hackett chaired the Wilkes County Democratic Party organization for many years, and served as mayor of Wilkesboro.  He was unsuccessful in a run for the U.S. Congress in 1896, but won a seat ten years later representing North Carolina's 8th congressional district in the 60th United States Congress (defeating incumbent Republican E. Spencer Blackburn).  In 1908, Hackett was defeated for re-election by Charles Holden Cowles, and he returned to practicing law. Hackett died in Statesville, Iredell County, NC, on November 22, 1923.

External links

OurCampaigns.com

University of North Carolina at Chapel Hill alumni
1866 births
1923 deaths
Mayors of places in North Carolina
Democratic Party members of the United States House of Representatives from North Carolina
People from Wilkesboro, North Carolina